Fortifications of Gothenburg were initially embankments along the newly dug city moat (Vallgraven) in 
Gothenburg, Sweden. They were built to defend Gothenburg which was Sweden's  only direct access to the North Sea and Atlantic Ocean.

History
Gothenburg was founded in 1621 at the direction of  King Gustav II Adolf. 
Construction beginning in 1624 under the leadership of  engineers, Captain Johan Schultz (Schouten) and Johan Jacobssen Kuyl (Kuhl), following a design by chief engineer Johan Rodenburg. The works were based upon the well-established Dutch school of fortification.

When military engineer  Erik Dahlberg  (1625–1703) took responsibility for Sweden's fortifications in 1676 he implemented the wishes of King Karl XI  for modern bastions of high wall construction. The ramparts were lined with walls of blasted rock and the fortified town of Gothenburg developed with 13 polygonal bastions and accompanying moat, ravelins and 3 city gates (Kungsporten; Nya porten, later renamed Drottningporten; and Karlsporten/Hållgårdsporten).

Gothenburg was growing rapidly by the end of the 1700s while the fortifications had suffered from poor maintenance.
Demolition of the fortifications began in 1807, and was completed within ten years. The only surviving piece of bastion is Carolus XI Rex (named after King Charles XI of Sweden), on the side of the Lilla Otterhällan hill.

See also
History of Gothenburg
Skansen Kronan
Skansen Lejonet

References

Other sources
Fästningen Göteborg : samlingar till stadens arkeologi. Mölndal: Avdelningen för arkeologiska undersökningar (Riksantikvarieämbetet. 2006)  

1620s in Sweden
Gothenburg
Demolished buildings and structures in Sweden
Gothenburg
History of Gothenburg
Got